The 23rd Awit Awards were held on September 30, 2010 at the SM Mall of Asia in Bay City, Pasay. They honored achievements in the Philippine music industry for the year 2009.

Noel Cabangon, Ito Rapadas and Gary Valenciano received the most nominations with nine. They were followed by Jonathan Manalo and Martin Nievera with seven.

The People's Choice Awards was renamed Music Uplate Live Texters' Choice Poll just for this year as sponsored by the television show which its  namesake.

Before the awards night, the Music Expo was held in September 28 to 29, which includes music seminars and performances. The pre-show was hosted by radio jocks, Nicole Hyala and Chris Tsuper, while the main ceremony was hosted by Tutti Caringal, Yeng Constantino and Karylle. Noel Cabangon and Gloc-9 won the most awards with four. For the first time in the history of Awit Awards, a rap song won the Song of the Year, which was "Upuan" by Gloc-9.

Winners and nominees
Winners are listed first and highlighted in bold. Nominated producers, composers and lyricists are not included in this list, unless noted. For the full list, please go to their official website.

Performance Awards

Creativity Awards
{| class="wikitable"
|-
! style="background:#EEDD82;" ! width:50%"  |Album of the Year
! style="background:#EEDD82;" ! width:50%"  |Song of the Year
|-

| valign="top" |
 ''Byahe – Noel Cabangon Romance Revisited: The Love Songs of Jose Mari Chan – Christian Bautista
 As 1 – Martin Nievera & Gary Valenciano
 Unchanging Love – Zsa Zsa Padilla
 Aiza Seguerra Live! – Aiza Seguerra

| valign="top" |
 "Upuan"Aristotle Pollisco (composer & lyricist) "Always You"
Jonathan Manalo (composer & lyricist)
 "As 1"
Gina Godinez (composer)
Albert Chan (lyricist)
 "Lapit"
Yeng Constantino (composer & lyricist)
 "Nung Iniwan Mo Ako"
Ebe Dancel (composer & lyricist)

|-
! style="background:#EEDD82;" ! width:50%"  |Best Selling Album of the Year
! style="background:#EEDD82;" ! width:50%"  |Best Ballad Recording
|-

| valign="top" |
 Ikaw na Nga – Willie Revillame| valign="top" |
 "Tayong Dalawa" – Gary Valenciano 
 "Tell Me Your Name" – Christian Bautista 
 "Kahit Maputi na ang Buhok Ko" – Noel Cabangon 
 "Why Can't It Be" – Gino Padilla 
 "Nung Iniwan Mo Ako" –  Sinosikat?

|-
! style="background:#EEDD82;" ! width:50%"  |Best Rock/Alternative Recording
! style="background:#EEDD82;" ! width:50%"  |Best World Music Recording
|-

| valign="top" |
 "Martilyo" – Gloc-9 feat. Dex Yu "Castaway" – Franco
 "Wala" – Kamikazee
 "AYT" – Sponge Cola feat. Gary Valenciano
 "Hay Buhay" – Sugarfree

| valign="top" |
 "Binibini" – Noel Cabangon 
 "Loko" – Chris Cayzer
 "Himig ng Pag-ibig" – Yeng Constantino 
 "Eres Mio" – Josh Santana
 "Kaibigang Hangin" – Skabeche

|-
! style="background:#EEDD82;" ! width:50%"  |Best Novelty Recording
! style="background:#EEDD82;" ! width:50%"  |Best Inspirational/Religious Recording
|-

| valign="top" |
 "Lumayo Ka man sa Laklak" – Moymoy Palaboy "Politiko" – Richie D'Horsie
 "Mahal Kita Kasi" – Nicole Hyala & Chris Tsuper
 "Bratatat" – Pokwang
 "Mas Mahal na Kita Ngayon" – Young Men

| valign="top" |
 "Always You" – Charice Pempengco "Iukit ang 'Yong Batas" – Noel Cabangon & Bukas Palad Music Ministry
 "Saranggola sa Ulan" – Sharon Cuneta 
 "Nariyan Ka" – Juris
 "Now That I Have You – Philippine Madrigal Singers

|-
! style="background:#EEDD82;" ! width:50%"  |Best Christmas Recording
! style="background:#EEDD82;" ! width:50%"  |Best Rap Recording
|-

| valign="top" |
 "You Know It’s Christmas" – Hanna Flores "Ganyan ang Pasko" – Toni Gonzaga "Tuloy pa Rin ang Pasko" – Nicole Hyala & Chris Tsuper
 "Gumising" – Pavi & Tropicalia
 "Narito na ang Pasko" – Ariel Rivera
 "Star ng Pasko" – ABS-CBN Artists

| valign="top" |
 "Upuan" – Gloc-9 feat. Jeazell Grutas "Nagmahal Ako" – Dagtang Lason
 "Meron Akong Ano" – Kamikazee 
 "Hala Bira" – Pinoy Republic
 "That Girl" – Young JV

|-
! style="background:#EEDD82;" ! width:50%"  |Best Jazz Recording
! style="background:#EEDD82;" ! width:50%"  |Best R&B Recording
|-

| valign="top" |
 Mr. Musikero" – Sinosikat? "From Long Ago" – Johnny Alegre

| valign="top" |
 "Moments of Love" – Kris Lawrence "Kasalanan Nga Ba?" (R&B Version) – Gretchen Espina
 "How Do I Make You Love Me?" – Gian Magdangal
 "H.S. Romance" – Sinosikat?

|-
! style="background:#EEDD82;" ! width:50%"  |Best Song Written for Movie/TV/Stage Play
|-

| valign="top" |
 "Ang Buhay Nga Naman" (from Ded na si Lolo) – Noel Cabangon
 "Tagumpay" (from Pinoy Fear Factor) – Chivas
 "Alay na Alaala" (from The Forgotten War'') – Kenyo
|}

Technical Achievement Awards

Digital Awards

Music Uplate Live Texters' Choice Poll

Special Awards

Performers
This is in order of appearance'''.

References

External links
 Official Website of the Awit Awards

Awit Awards
2010 music awards
2010 in Philippine music